Nicolás 'Nico' Baleani Springolo Serra (born 16 November 1992) is a Spanish footballer who plays as a midfielder for CE Constància.

Football career
Born in Palma, Majorca, Balearic Islands, Baleani graduated with local giants RCD Mallorca's youth system, and made his senior debuts with the reserves in the 2010–11 campaign in Segunda División B. On 6 January 2013 he made his official debut with the first team, playing 24 minutes in a 2–1 away win against Sevilla FC for the season's Copa del Rey.

In the 2013 summer Baleani left Mallorca and moved to Czech Republic, but returned to Spain in the following transfer window, joining La Roda CF. On 12 July 2014 he returned to his former club Mallorca, being again assigned to the reserves.

On 18 January 2019, Baleani was loaned out from SD Leioa to CE Constància.

References

External links
 
 

1992 births
Living people
Footballers from Palma de Mallorca
Spanish footballers
Association football midfielders
Segunda División B players
Tercera División players
RCD Mallorca B players
RCD Mallorca players
La Roda CF players
CD Llosetense players
SD Leioa players
CE Constància players